Bosko, the Talk-Ink Kid is a 1929 live-action/animated short film produced to sell a series of Bosko cartoons. The film was never released to theaters, and therefore not seen by a wide audience until 2000 (71 years later) on Cartoon Network's television special Toonheads: The Lost Cartoons. The film was produced on May 29, 1929 and directed by Hugh Harman and Rudolf Ising.

Plot 
Rudolf Ising is thinking of ideas for a new character, until he draws a blackfaced person with a fountain pen, who comes to life. Ising then talks to the character, and then asks his name. The new character introduces himself as Bosko. Ising tells Bosko to show what he can do. Bosko starts to tap dance, whistle, and sing. After dancing, Bosko looks directly to the screen. Bosko asks, "Who's all them folks out there in the dark?" Ising tells Bosko that they are the audience, and asks him if he can make them laugh; Bosko agrees to try. Bosko asks Ising if he can draw a piano; Ising does so. Bosko starts to press some piano keys. When one of the keys near the upper end of the keyboard produces a low note, Bosko removes the key and puts it in its proper place near the left end of the keyboard. Bosko hits more random notes, then plays a glissando. Bosko laughs, and then sings "Sonny Boy", accidentally sliding his tongue out. Bosko opens his hat and pulls his hair, letting his tongue out of his mouth again. He plays another song, singing, which causes his head to pop out like a slinky. After that, Bosko sings again. Ising says this is enough. He sucks Bosko, who also pulls the piano, back into his fountain pen, and then him back into the ink bottle. Bosko then pops out of the ink bottle and promises to return.

Production 
In 1928, when Walt Disney lost control of his Oswald The Lucky Rabbit cartoon series, producer Charles Mintz hired away several of Disney's animators to continue producing the Oswald cartoons for Universal Studios. These animators included Hugh Harman, Rudolf Ising, Isadore "Friz" Freleng, Carman "Max" Maxwell, Norm Blackburn, Paul Smith, and Rollin "Ham" Hamilton. The Mintz Oswald shorts were not as successful and in 1929, Universal chose to directly produce the series, establishing its own in-house cartoon studio headed by Walter Lantz, leaving Mintz's animators out of work.

The unemployed animators, led by Harman and Ising, decided to produce their own cartoons and made Bosko, The Talk-Ink Kid as a demonstration to show to distributors, using a character the two cartoonists had created and copyrighted in 1927–28, while still working with Disney.

Rudolf Ising appeared on-screen as himself in the short and Carman Maxwell performed the voice of Bosko. Harman and Ising shopped for a distributor, but were turned down by both Paramount Pictures and Universal. Leon Schlesinger, head of Pacific Title & Art Studio took an interest in Bosko and used his connections with Warner Bros. Pictures to get a distribution deal for a cartoon series that Harman and Ising later named Looney Tunes, a play on the name of Walt Disney's Silly Symphony series.

The cartoon pioneered the pre-synch technique, now standard in American animation, as Harman and Ising understood the shortcomings of recording the sound after the animation in relation to dialogue. Apparently, the entire soundtrack was filmed on the spot, with Maxwell being off-camera. According to cartoon historian Mark Kausler, a camera pointed at Maxwell's mouth to provide reference for the animation, but it was finally determined that it wasn't necessary and that it looked "too forced".

Availability 
Bosko, the Talk-Ink Kid is available on disc 3 of the DVD set Looney Tunes Golden Collection: Volume 1 and disc 3 of the Blu-ray set Looney Tunes Platinum Collection: Volume 2.

Preservation 
The short was considered lost for many decades, with only the film's Vitaphone soundtrack still in existence. Turner Entertainment Co. had a 35mm copy, but did not acknowledge its existence until 1999. The short was later released on the Looney Tunes Golden Collection: Volume 1 DVD.

References

External links 

 
 
 
 Bosko the Talk Ink Kid on YouTube

1920s English-language films
1929 animated films
1929 short films
1920s American animated films
1920s animated short films
1929 comedy films
American black-and-white films
Films directed by Hugh Harman
Films directed by Rudolf Ising
Looney Tunes shorts
Bosko films
Short films with live action and animation
African-American animated films
African-American comedy films
American animated short films
Warner Bros. animated short films